Peñón Blanco is a city and seat of the municipality of Peñón Blanco in the Mexican state of Durango.

It is located in the central part of the State of Durango, at the North of Los Llanos y los Valles. It limits with Nazas to the north, San Juan del Río to the west, Cuencamé to the east, and with Guadalupe Victoria to the south.

As of 2010, the town of Peñón Blanco had a population of 5,271.

Festivals
The most important event in Peñón Blanco as far as traditional "fiestas", is La Feria de San Diego de Alcalá that takes place on November 13 of every year. The culmination of several events such as dances and competitions to select the most beautiful flower of the "county" (La flor mas bella del ejido) What it is, they crown the most beautiful girl of the municipality...

Other events not local events but are celebrated with great effervescence, such events are; Mothers' day, May 10th; Students graduations by the end of the month of June of every year; September 15, Mexican Independence day; December 12, Our Lady of Guadalupe; and of course, Christmas and New Years celebration. Many annual parties occur too, presidential elections. . . and cabalgatas, in honor of teachers, and father's day. . .

References

External links 
Peñón Blanco, at the Federal Government site
Peñón Blanco, website 

Populated places in Durango